Umayya ibn Khalaf (died 13 March 624) was an Arab slave master and the chieftain of the Banu Jumah of the Quraysh in the seventh century. He was one of the chief opponents against the Muslims led by Muhammad. Umayya is best known as the master of Bilal ibn Rabah, a slave he tortured for embracing Islam who eventually became the first mu'azzin.

Family
Umayyah ibn Khalaf was a son of Khalaf ibn Habib ibn Wahb ibn Hudhafah ibn Jumah and he was a brother of Ubay ibn Khalaf. He married three times:
By his wife, Safiya bint Ma'mar ibn Habib, he had some sons: Safwan, Ahyah, and Salamah. 
By his wife, Karima bint Ma'mar ibn Habib, he had some sons: Walid and Ali (who were both slain at Badr), Rabi'ah, Muslim, Ma'bad and Mas'ud. 
By his wife, Layla bint Habib al-Tamimiyya from B. Tamim, he had a daughter, named al-Taw'ama bint Umayyah.

Opposition to Islam
Umayyah was involved in the pagan religious ceremonies of Mecca, where he distributed perfume in the square of the Kaaba.

After Muhammad began to preach against idolatry, Umayyah became a staunch opponent of the new teaching. He used to slander Muhammad, and it is about him that Allah revealed Surah Humaza: "Woe to the slanderer and backbiter". 
He subjected his slave Bilal ibn Rabah to torture for having adopted Islam. He forced Bilal to lie on hot desert sand and pinned him down with a heavy stone on his chest. When Bilal still refused to denounce Islam, a heavy person was to jump on the stone. Bilal kept repeating, "Ahad! Ahad!" (One God! One God!)

Friendship with Abd al-Rahman
Ummayah had a very close and dear friend named Abdu Amr. Their friendship was strained when Abdu Amr converted to Islam. Abdu Amr changed his name to Abd al-Rahman and later emigrated to Medina. Not only that, but to Ummayah's chagrin and dismay, Abdu Amr then gave his sister in marriage to Bilal ibn Rabah, a black man who had previously been Ummayah's slave. All of these events caused pain and dismay, but in tribal societies at that time, ties of childhood friendship were extraordinarily strong and lasting. Ummayah retained affection and a sense of duty towards his old friend, which was reciprocated. Because of their friendship, the two friends formed a written agreement, according to which Abdul Rahman was to protect Umayah's property and family in Medina, while Umayyah would protect Abd-al-Rahman's property and family in Mecca. While drafting the document, when Abd al-Rahman was referred to by his new (Islamic) name, Umayyah protested, saying "I do not know any Ar-Rahman" and requested that the pre-Islamic name, "Abdu Amr," be used. It is another measure of the reciprocity of affection between them that Abd al-Rahman yielded, and was referred to as "Abdu Amr" in the document.

Friendship with Sa'd
Umayyah was also an good friend of Sa'd ibn Mua'dh, the leader of the Bani Aus . When Umayyah was in Medina on his way to Syria, he used to stay with Sa'd and when Sa'd was in Mecca, he used to stay with Umayah.

Prior to the Battle of Badr, Sa'd visited Mecca once to perform his Umrah with Umayyah, when they came across Abu Jahl. They had an argument, and as it became heated, Sa'd threatened Abu Jahl with stopping the Meccan trade route to Syria and informed Umayyah that his life was threatened by Muhammad.

Battle of Badr

In the build-up to the battle of Badr, Umayyah received a visit from his childhood friend Sa'd, who had become a Muslim, emigrated to Medina, and was close to Muhammad. Sa'd had come to Mecca supposedly for Umrah ("minor" pilgrimage), but also to make Umayyah beware. Sa'd told Umayyah in no uncertain terms that Muhammad had an antipathy for Umayyah, that his life was in danger from the Muslims, including Muhammad, and that he should expect no mercy from either Muhammad or the Muslims in case he falls into their hands. The reason for this enmity and antipathy was Umayyah's former slave that Bilal, who had by now become a favorite with Muhammad, was heavily tortured by Umayyah to prior to his emancipation.

In March 624, the Meccans decided to confront the Muslim forces that threatened a caravan from Syria led by Abu Sufyan ibn Harb. Abu Jahl rallied the people for war, saying, "Go and protect your caravan." Umayyah, who was anxious after having received Sa'd warning, did not want to leave Mecca; but Abu Jahl said to him: "O Abu Safwan! If the people see you staying behind, though you are the chief of the people of the Valley, then they will remain behind with you." Abu Jahl urged until Umayyah said, "As you have forced me to change my mind, I will buy the best camel in Mecca." Umayyah told his wife: "O Umm Safwan, prepare what I need (for the journey)." She said to him, "O Abu Safwan! Have you forgotten what your Yathribi brother told you?" He said, "No, but I do not want to go with them except for a short distance." On the way to engagement with the Muslims, Umayyah tied his camel wherever he camped, always remaining alert.

Although Abu Sufyan had the informed the Meccan forcer that the caravan was saved, the Meccan forcer nonetheless proceeded to confront the Muslim forces. Battle was joined on 13 March 624. The forces from Mecca were routed by the Muslims. The battle was lost by the non-Muslims and Umayyah was captured by his old friend Abdul Rahman ibn Awf, who went out of his way to look for and seize Umayyah in order to protect his life.

Death

Umayyah ibn Khalaf was the head of the Bani Jumah tribe of the Quraysh in the Arabian Peninsula, and he was one of the leaders of the city of Mecca. Umayyah distributed perfume on the streets of Mecca to celebrate pagan festivals, and he was opposed to Muhammad's teachings of monotheism. A cruel man, he repeatedly tortured his slave Bilal ibn Rabbah, who repeatedly refused to renounce Islam. Umayyah was one of the commanders at the Battle of Badr in 624, where he was captured by his old friend 'Abd al-Rahman ibn 'Awf and executed by his former slave Bilal ibn Rabah.

See also
List of expeditions of Muhammad

References

Opponents of Muhammad
People killed at the Battle of Badr
Quraysh
624 deaths